Anatomy of a Poet (released June 1994) is the eighth studio album from the British electronica duo In the Nursery. It includes several tracks featuring samples of author Colin Wilson reading his favourite poetry. The album was released on CD only.

Track listing
All tracks by Klive and Nigel Humberstone except where noted

 "Bombed" – 5:50
 "Anatomy of a Poet" – 4:34
 "In Perpetuum" – 4:49
 "Motive" – 3:37
 "Hallucinations?" (dream world mix) – 4:36
 "Blue Lovers" – 5:47
 "Paper Desert" – 5:11
 "Byzantium" – 3:24
 "Seventh Seal" (Scott Engel) – 5:02
 "The Golden Journey" – 4:32
 "Touched with Fire" – 1:58
 "Hallucinations? (The Tower III)" ("corp012" re-release) – 3:10
 "November Trees" ("corp012" re-release) – 1:48
 "Hallucinations? (A Sense of Reality)" ("corp012" re-release) – 8:10

Samples
The following poetry features on the album. It was selected and read by Colin Wilson and recorded on location, Gorran Haven, Cornwall in December 1993.
 
 "Anatomy of a Poet" includes reading from "Cynara" by Ernest Dowson
 "Motive", includes reading from "The Harlot's House" by Oscar Wilde
 "Byzantium" includes reading from "(Sailing to) Byzantium" by W. B. Yeats
 "The Golden Journey" includes reading from "The Golden Journey to Samarkand" by James Elroy Flecker

Personnel 

John Crossley – Remastering
Jill Crowther – Oboe
Dominike Duplaa – Design
Stephen Harris – Producer
In the Nursery – Producer
Dolores C. Marguerite – Vocals
Mark Murphy – Guitar
Pete Stewart – Assistant Engineer
Colin Wilson – Narrator, Engineer

References

External links
 Anatomy of a Poet on band's website

In the Nursery albums
1994 albums
Third Mind Records albums